Peninsula Power is an Australian soccer club from Redcliffe, Queensland. It was formed in 2000 following a merger of the Redcliffe City and Margate clubs. It competes in the National Premier Leagues Queensland.

History

Redcliffe City Soccer Club
The Redcliffe Soccer Club initially competed in Brisbane's junior competitions, fielding a team in junior first grade in 1948. The club first competed in Brisbane senior competition in 1952, entering the league in Division 4. In its first 20 years, the club's managed just one season in Division 2 in 1962, winning just two games and being relegated.

The club changed its name to Redcliffe City after the local government area was upgraded in status from a town to a city in 1959. After a decade in the lower divisions, the club played in Division 2 from 1973 to 1978. With the formation of the Queensland State League in 1979, Redcliffe City was promoted to Division 1 but finished 11th and was relegated.

After coming third in Division 2 in 1982, Redcliffe City was promoted to Division 1 for 1983, the division below the newly formed Brisbane Premier League. The following season, the club failed to win a game and was relegated to the third tier of Brisbane soccer in which it competed from 1985 to 1992. After four season in Division 4 (Tier 4), the club returned to the third tier for its final three seasons before merging with Margate after the 1999 season.

Margate Soccer Club
Margate Soccer Club first appeared in senior soccer in the 1977 season, playing a single season in Sunshine Coast Division One. After two season in Brisbane Division 4 in 1985 and 1986, Margate returned to its focus on junior soccer. Returning to senior competition in 1994, the club won the 1997 Division 2 premiership and was promoted to the third tier. In Division 1 (Tier 3) it completed its last two seasons in the same division as Redcliffe City before the two clubs merged in early 2000 to form Peninsula Power.

Peninsula Power FC
Peninsula Power FC was formed in 2000 upon the amalgamation of the Redcliffe City and Margate soccer clubs and initially competed in Division 1, then the third tier of Brisbane soccer. It won its first honours in its first season taking out the Semi-Pro Youth competition. In the 2002 season the club finished top of Division 2 league table, winning the grand final 2–0 over Beenleigh. After grand final losses in 2004 and 2005, promotion to the Brisbane Premier League was won in 2006 with a second-place finish in Premier Division 1.

In 2007, Peninsula Power survived a close relegation battle in their first BPL season after achieving a 0–0 draw against fellow contenders Ipswich Knights on the last day of the season. In 2008 Peninsula Power finished runners-up to Rochedale Rovers in the league and runners-up in the final series after a 3–2 grand final loss to Brisbane City. The following season Peninsula Power went one better, finishing top of the Brisbane Premier League regular season for the first time in 2009. During this period the head coach was Terry Kirkham who saw the club became a mainstay of the BPL during his four season in charge.

From 2008 to 2016, Peninsula Power have qualified for the Brisbane Premier League finals series, never finishing lower than fourth place except for a sixth placing in 2010 when a Final Six finals system operated due to a 14 team league. The crowning achievement of this era was the three consecutive BPLchampionships won in 2013, 2014 and 2015. Each time the club failed to win the regular season premiership, but peaked at the right time. Their grand finals wins were:
2013 Won 5–1 vs Lions FC (Scorers: Power – Ally Graham 4, Joshua Ahern; Lions FC – own goal)
2014 Won 5–0 vs Wolves FC (Scorers: Shaun Feuerriegel 2, Taylor Hart, Greig Henslee, Richard Hurlin)
2015 Won 1–0 vs Lions FC (Scorer: Shaun Feuerriegel)

Peninsula Power has also won Brisbane's premier cup competition twice. Their cup final wins were:
2008 Won 4–2 on penalties (0–0 a.e.t.) vs Eastern Suburbs
2013 Won 2–0 vs Logan Lightning (Scorers: Ally Graham 2)

In 2017, Peninsula Power reached the FFA Cup proper for the first time, qualifying with a 3–0 win over Grange Thistle in the final preliminary round. In the Round of 32, Peninsula Power lost a close fought match 2–0 to A-League club Melbourne City at Dolphin Oval witnessed by 4,017 spectators, a record attendance for an FFA Cup match in Queensland.

In May 2017, Football Queensland announced Peninsula Power FC were among the 14 clubs accepted to form the Football Queensland Premier League for its initial season in 2018.

In 2018, Peninsula Power won the Football Queensland Premier League and were promoted to the Queensland National Premier League (NPL).

In 2019, Peninsula Power finished 3rd in its inaugural season in the Football Queensland National Premier League. They were eliminated in the semi-finals by Gold Coast Knights 2–1.

In 2020, a season ravaged by COVID-19 and Peninsula Power's second season in the Football Queensland National Premier League competition, they finished Premiers, winning the league by 5 points ahead of Olympic FC. They were eliminated by Lions FC in the semi-finals, 4–1

Recent seasons

Source:

The tier in the above table is the level in the Australian soccer league system

Honours
Peninsula Power
Tier 1 of Queensland competition
Football Queensland National Premier League – Premiers 2020
Football Queensland Premier League – Premiers 2018; Champions 2018
Brisbane Premier League – Premiers 2009; Champions 2013, 2014, 2015
Brisbane Premier Cup – Winner 2008
Canale Cup – Winner 2013
Tier 3 of Brisbane competition
Premier Division 2 – Premiers and Champions 2002

Redcliffe City
Tier 5 of Brisbane competition
Brisbane Division 5B – Premiers 1967

Margate
Tier 4 of Brisbane competition
Brisbane Division 2 – Premiers 1997
Tier 6 of Brisbane competition
Brisbane Division 6 – Premiers and Champions 1996
Tier 9 of Brisbane competition
Brisbane Division 9B – Champions 1994

Source:

References

External links
 

Soccer clubs in Brisbane
Brisbane Premier League teams
Association football clubs established in 2000
2000 establishments in Australia